Egil Johansen (born 30 April 1962) is a Norwegian football player. He was born in Oslo. He played for the club Vålerengen, and also for the Norwegian national team. He competed at the 1984 Summer Olympics in Los Angeles.

References

External links

1962 births
Living people
Footballers from Oslo
Norwegian footballers
Norway international footballers
Vålerenga Fotball players
Footballers at the 1984 Summer Olympics
Olympic footballers of Norway
Association football midfielders